Darin Adler was the technical lead for Apple Computer's System 7 operating system release. During 1985–1987 he worked for ICOM Simulations as primary developer of the MacVenture game engine which ran Déjà Vu: A Nightmare Comes True, Uninvited, and Shadowgate. Adler went on to work at General Magic and Eazel.

, he is the engineering manager of the Safari Web browser team at Apple, which also develops the WebKit framework. Adler was part of the original team that shipped the beta releases and 1.0 release of Safari, as well as Safari 3.0 beta for Microsoft Windows.

Adler is a frequent speaker at Apple's Worldwide Developers Conference and Stump the Experts panelist.

See also
Andy Hertzfeld
Blue Meanies (Apple Computer)
Dave Hyatt
GNOME
Maciej Stachowiak
MacVenture

References

External links
 Bent Spoon Software - Darin Adler's consulting company
 Description of Adler on Boost.org
 Diane Patterson's Blog: "Nobody Knows Anything"

American computer programmers
Apple Inc. employees
Year of birth missing (living people)
Living people